Cees Veerman (6 October 1943 – 15 March 2014) was a Dutch musician. He was a singer, composer and guitarist for the rock band The Cats. He was born in Volendam in the province of North Holland.

Veerman died in his sleep on the morning of 15 March 2014 in Yogyakarta, Yogyakarta Special Region, Indonesia. He was 70 years old.

References

Other websites

 Cees Veerman at Discogs

1943 births
2014 deaths
Dutch rock guitarists
Dutch male guitarists
Dutch rock singers
Dutch songwriters
People from Volendam
English-language singers from the Netherlands